The 2015–16 Logan Cup was a first-class cricket competition held in Zimbabwe from 25 November 2014 to 5 March 2015. The tournament was won by the Mashonaland Eagles, who claimed their second title.

Craig Ervine of the Matabeleland Tuskers finished the competition as the leading run-scorer, accumulating 477 runs. The leading wicket-taker was Shingirai Masakadza of the Mountaineers, with 25 wickets.

Points table

External links
 Series home at ESPN Cricinfo

References

Logan Cup
Logan Cup
Logan Cup
Logan Cup